Eric P. DeLange is a retired United States Air Force brigadier general who last served as director for cyberspace operations of the North American Aerospace Defense Command and United States Northern Command. He previously served as the director for cyberspace operations and warfighter communications of the United States Air Force. Prior to that, he was the senior executive officer of the Vice Chief of Staff of the Air Force. In April 2021, he was assigned to become director, cyberspace operations of the U.S. Northern Command, replacing Major General Angela M. Cadwell.

References 

Living people
Year of birth missing (living people)
Place of birth missing (living people)
United States Air Force generals
Brigadier generals